Aleksei Filippov may refer to:

 Aleksei Filippov (footballer born 1973), Russian footballer who most notably played for FC Dynamo Moscow
 Aleksei Filippov (footballer born 1975), Russian footballer with FC Druzhba Maykop
 Aleksei Filippov (writer), Russian writer nominated for Anti-Booker prize in 2000
 Aleksei Fedorovich Filippov (1923 – 2006), Russian mathematician, professor of Moscow State University